The Beishan Old Western-style House is a house in Jinning Township, Kinmen County, Taiwan.

History
The house was established in 1928. During the Battle of Guningtou in 1949, the house was occupied by the People's Liberation Army and was turned into a command post.

Architecture
The house was constructed with Western architectural style. It consists of two courtyards.

See also
 List of tourist attractions in Taiwan

References

1928 establishments in Taiwan
Buildings and structures in Kinmen County
Houses completed in 1928
Houses in Taiwan
Jinning Township
Tourist attractions in Kinmen County